Bhangri Pratham Khanda is a census town in the Dinhata I CD block in the Dinhata subdivision of the Cooch Behar district in the state of West Bengal, India.

Geography

Location

Area overview
The map alongside shows the eastern part of the district. In Tufanganj subdivision 6.97% of the population lives in the urban areas and 93.02% lives in the rural areas. In Dinhata subdivision 5.98% of the population lives in the urban areas and 94.02% lives in the urban areas. The entire district forms the flat alluvial flood plains of mighty rivers.

Note: The map alongside presents some of the notable locations in the subdivisions. All places marked in the map are linked in the larger full screen map.

Demographics
As per the 2011 Census of India, Bhangri Pratham Khanda had a total population of 4,379. There were 2,277 (52%) males and 2,102 (48%) females. There were 433 persons in the age range of 0 to 6 years. The total number of literate people in Bhangri Pratham Khanda was 3,332 (84.44% of the population over 6 years).

 India census, Bhangri Pratham Khanda had a population of 4113. Males constitute 51% of the population and females 49%. Bhangri Pratham Khanda has an average literacy rate of 69%, higher than the national average of 59.5%; with male literacy of 75% and female literacy of 63%. 12% of the population is under 6 years of age.

Infrastructure
According to the District Census Handbook 2011, Koch Bihar, Bhangri Pratham Khanda covered an area of 1.46 km2. Among the civic amenities, it had 7.5 km roads, the protected water supply involved  hand pumps. It had 395 electric connections. Among the educational facilities it had 3  primary schools, other educational facilities were at Dinhata 2 km away. Important commodities it produced were bamboo craft and chewing tobacco.

References

Cities and towns in Cooch Behar district